The Esmeraldas River is a  river in northwestern Ecuador that flows into the Pacific Ocean at the city of Esmeraldas. Among its tributaries is the Guayllabamba River which drains Quito. Charles Marie de la Condamine sailed up it and then climbed the Andes Mountains when on the Ecuadorian Expedition that left France in May 1735.

The mouth of the river has extensive stands of mangroves, part of the Esmeraldas–Pacific Colombia mangroves ecoregion.

Fauna

Fish 

 The Green Terror Cichlid Andinoacara rivulatus (Günther, 1860)
 Andinoacara blombergi Wijkmark, S. O. Kullander & Barriga S., 2012

References

Rivers of Ecuador